The Babingley is a minor river in the northwest of the county Norfolk in England. It runs  from its source at the village of Flitcham to the River Great Ouse at Wootton Marshes where it terminates.

Course of the river
The Babingley rises in “Further Back Wood”, a little way east of the village of Flitcham, close to Abbey Farm. A watermill once stood on the river bank, but traces of it are long gone; the watercourse and the millpond are all that remain.

From here the river runs through a gentle sloped valley westwards and passes under the B1153 road and into Hillington Park. There is tributary spring in a meadow on the Hillington side of Pond Farm, at Congham. This tributary of the river is called the River Cong, flowing through the woods and over an impressive waterfall, where in the past it powered all the machinery within the Congham Oil Mill. The Cong then flows on under the A148 and joins the Babingley close by the Gatton Waters caravan site. After Hillington Park the river flows into the lake that served another long-gone watermill that stood close to Hillington Hall The now increased force of water once powered the large waterwheel at what, years ago was known as West Newton Paper Mill. In the late 18th century sadly the miller went mad and his son then took over the business. It then changed over from making paper to grinding corn which lasted up until a few years after the last war. From the lake the river runs through a wooded valley out of the Park and into the countryside south of the royal estate of Sandringham. The banks of the river along this stretch are very wooded. Just past Hillington, the river passes the northern edge of a lake that has been used as a camping and caravan site.

The river continues westward skirting the northern edge of a large Forestry Commission plantation and south of Sandringham. At the end of the plantation there once was Babingley Watermill; again, no traces survive.

The river passes under the A 149 road and skirts around the north of the village Castle Rising, where it passes under Babingley Bridge. In the fields on the other side of the bridge once was the village of Babingley, now lost, although the remains of the church of St Felix can still be found.

The river now crosses into fen and marshland and passes under the disused railway bed of the line that runs from King’s Lynn to Wolferton and once carried many members of the royal family on their way to Sandringham. The river now meanders in a northerly direction towards The Wash. It then switches into a man-made watercourse that directs it southward through Wootton Marsh towards Vinegar Middle where the river finally runs into the river Great Ouse estuary at Lynn Channel.

Saint Felix and the river Babingley
In the hamlet of Babingley, near the river, Saint Felix of Burgundy is said to have landed c.630 AD to introduce Christianity to East Anglia. Local legend has it that St. Felix's ship was wrecked while travelling up the river Babingley. According to legend, he was rescued by beavers, and subsequently made one of the beavers a bishop.

References

External links
Norfolk Watermills
River Babingley environment agency.gov.uk

Babingley